Wanderson Henrique do Nascimento Silva (born 13 September 1991), known as Wanderson, is a Brazilian footballer who plays for FC Dila Gori in the Erovnuli Liga as a left back.

Career

Club
On 13 February 2016, Wanderson made his debut for Bnei Sakhnin in the Israeli Premier League a 2–0 away victory against Bnei Yehuda.

On 23 July 2018, Wanderson signed a one-year contract with Azerbaijan Premier League side Sabah FK. On 15 May 2019, Sabah confirmed Wanderson's release.

References

External links

1991 births
Living people
Association football defenders
Brazilian footballers
Brazilian expatriate footballers
Clube Atlético Mineiro players
Vila Nova Futebol Clube players
Clube Atlético Juventus players
São José Esporte Clube players
Grêmio Esportivo Anápolis players
Bnei Sakhnin F.C. players
Sabah FC (Azerbaijan) players
Associação Desportiva São Caetano players
FC Dila Gori players
Israeli Premier League players
Azerbaijan Premier League players
Erovnuli Liga players
Campeonato Brasileiro Série C players
Campeonato Brasileiro Série D players
Expatriate footballers in Israel
Expatriate footballers in Azerbaijan
Expatriate footballers in Georgia (country)
Brazilian expatriate sportspeople in Azerbaijan
Brazilian expatriate sportspeople in Israel
Brazilian expatriate sportspeople in Georgia (country)